Signature tags or sig tags are small digital images that are used to accompany an HTML-formatted email or Internet forum post. They are also often used on social networking pages. They are used as a mark of recognition or individualism, or to convey emotion, sentiment, or sometimes support for the illustrated concept. 

Sig tags are often personalised with the user's name by manipulation in a graphics software package. Sig tags are particularly popular with teenage computer users, and those who are socially active online. A sig tag is generally used below or at the end of a message, in contrast to an avatar, which is generally used next to the name of the poster on a forum.

Subjects and types 
Popular subjects for sig tags are smileys, dollz, popular media figures from music, or TV shows, signs, cute animals, flowers and seasonal greetings.

A small image with a generalised, non-customised slogan, used in the same way, is generally just known as a graphics tag, or a snag (because they are 'snagged' or downloaded quickly from an originating website).

Sig tags are sometimes animated, using the .gif file format. Graphics software programs such as GNU Image Manipulation Program, Corel Paint Shop Pro and Adobe Photoshop are popular choices for the manipulation of digital images in creating sig tags.

Creation 
A complex custom sig tag may consist of a number of amalgamated elements, which may be obtained online from popular sig tag community resources. These elements may include a mask (grid or background), a tube (image or figure on a transparent background), embellishments (additional decorative objects), and textures. These elements are normally used subject to copyright restrictions similar to those imposed on the use of dollz (dollz netiquette).

Community 
The creation of sig tags is a widespread online hobby, regarded as a subsidiary of graphic art. It has been a long-lived phenomenon in internet terms, with little recorded history, and obscure, non-specified origins. This is largely due to its collaborative nature, and the disappearance of various websites important in the development of the hobby.

The sig tag community is notable by its emphasis on sharing, mutual support, advice and appreciation. In fact, a conventional classing system (Novice, Moderate, Intermediate, Semi-Professional, Professional) is sometimes used to rank people on their skills in making sig tags. Many sig tag websites feature a busy forum and tutorials and users are encouraged to download images. Increasingly, these sites tend to be membership-based.

More recently the tagging community has been dying. This may be due to the fact that tagging is often regarded as the lowest skilled form of computer graphics and the least profitable on many large forums.

Commercial sites 
Some graphic artists have developed their skills or moved into the production of sig tags as a business. They generally offer user-licences, customisation of their sig tags, and purchaseable downloadable elements to be used by the user in building personal sig tags.

Internet culture
Internet forum terminology